Gregorio Caloggero (27 May 1917 – September 1995) was a Peruvian cyclist. He competed in the individual and team road race events at the 1936 Summer Olympics.

References

External links
 

1917 births
1995 deaths
Peruvian male cyclists
Olympic cyclists of Peru
Cyclists at the 1936 Summer Olympics
Place of birth missing
20th-century Peruvian people